Ansegisus (Latin form of the Germanic name Ansegis, French form Anségise) may refer to:

 Saint Ansegisus, abbot of Luxeuil Abbey and Fontenelle Abbey
 Ansegisel, Frankish duke and mayor of the palace
 Ansegisus of Sens, Archbishop of Sens